The doubles luge at the 2014 Winter Olympics was held on 12 February 2014 at the Sliding Center Sanki in Rzhanaya Polyana, Russia.

Qualifying athletes
The top 18, with each nation allowed a maximum of 2, after five of five races. Romania and South Korea receive the team relay allocations to complete a team. 20 sleds qualified to compete, but only 19 competed as the Romanian's sled broke during training which meant they could not take part in the competition.

Results
Run 1 was started at 18:15 and Run 2 at 19:45.

References

Luge at the 2014 Winter Olympics
Men's events at the 2014 Winter Olympics